German progressive metal act Noekk released their third studio album, The Minstrel's Curse, on February 22, 2008. It was recorded and mixed during summer 2007 by Markus Stock and produced by MK for Prophecy Productions. The songs were composed and performed by Noekk and special guest Allen B. Konstanz.

Track listing 

 "The Minstrel's Curse" - 07:53
 "Song of Durin" - 06:37
 "How Long Is Ever" - 05:28
 "The Rumour and the Giantess" - 14:27

Credits 

 F. Baldachini
 F.F. Yuggoth
 Guest appearance by Allen B. Konstanz

References 

 Noekk: The Minstrel's Curse cd-booklet
 The Minstrel's Curse @ Encyclopaedia Metallum
 The Minstrel's Curse @ Prophecy Productions official website

2008 albums
Noekk albums